Chiraghabad also spelled as Chiragabad (literally means "place of  lights" ) is an exurb of Faisalabad situated at the southern boundary of Faisalabad District. Traditionally, it was residing place for Zamindars and other natives of Village number 334 which became part of Tehsil Gojra, District Toba Tek Singh in 1982. The town is provided with M4 motorway Interchange.

Population 
Rajput tribes are in overwhelming majority in this area. A small population of Syeds, Arains, Jatts, Gujjars, Kharals and Pathans also exist.

History 
The old name of this place was Kot ram chand, which means fortress of Hindu deity Rama.
During the 18th Century this village was established by a family which migrated from Mitha Tiwana, Khushab . This prominent family of rajputs brought the land of this entire village and settled down here. The Mahl family was the one of the only families to give up large holdings in Punjab to the refugees from India. Chiragabad was acquired by the wife of British colonel from the Mahl family known as Malik Muhammad Khan Mahl Bahadur, who arrived 14 years later after fighting World War I. This family is closely related to the Noon and Tiwana family. They have held important positions in the government of Pakistan during the governments of ZA Bhutto and Mian Nawaz Sharif.

Notable people 

https://tiktok.com/@rdxg0

References

Faisalabad District